The Men's 66 kg judo competitions at the 2022 Commonwealth Games in Birmingham, England took place on August 1st at the Coventry Arena. A total of 16 competitors from 14 nations took part.

Georgios Balarjishvili won Cyprus' first ever Commonwealth Games gold medal in the sport of judo after defeating Finlay Allan in the gold medal match.

Results 
The draw is as follows:

Repechages

References

External link 
 
 Results
 

M66
2022